Hjerkinn is a village in the municipality of Dovre in Innlandet county in Norway. It is one of the driest places in the country, with only  annual precipitation in the 10-year period 1905-14.

The European route E6 highway also passes through the village. It is also served by a small airport. Until 1993 there was mining in the village by Folldal Gruver. The Norwegian military also has a camp at Hjerkinn. Eystein Church is also located in the village, along the historic pilgrim's route to Nidaros Cathedral.

Name
The village is named Hjerkinn. The last element is kinn which means "steep mountainside". The village of Hjerkinn is lying beneath steep mountainsides, and since this place was an important crossroads with roads to Oppdal and Folldal herds were often driven through this area.

References

Dovre
Villages in Innlandet